The 1986 UK Championship (also known as the 1986 Tennent's UK Championship for sponsorship reasons) was a professional ranking snooker tournament that took place between 22 and 30 November 1986 at the Guild Hall in Preston, England. Scottish brewers Tennent's took over as sponsors of the UK Championship when Coral withdrew their sponsorship after eight years.

Steve Davis won his fifth UK title by defeating Neal Foulds 16–7 in the final; Foulds had won the International Open two months earlier. Winning the top prize of £60,000, Davis achieved a personal landmark with his victory as it took his career winnings above £1 million. The highest break of the tournament was a 144 made by Jimmy White.

The event is more remembered for Alex Higgins headbutting the Tournament Director Paul Hatherell following his last 16 victory against Mike Hallett. The incident threatening him to be removed from the tournament but he stayed and after defeating Wayne Jones in the quarter finals, he lost 3-9 to Steve Davis in the semi-final. Higgins was later fined £12,000 and banned from five subsequent tournaments.

Main draw

Final

Century breaks

 144, 125  Jimmy White
 141, 125  Willie Thorne
 141, 103  Tony Drago
 140, 136, 124, 123, 123, 114  Neal Foulds
 137, 136, 128  John Parrott
 132  Terry Griffiths
 131  Graham Cripsey
 129, 125, 119, 109  Cliff Thorburn
 124, 118, 110, 110, 104  Steve Davis
 124  David Taylor
 123  Gino Rigitano
 123  Jon Wright
 120  Mike Hallett

 117  Dennis Taylor
 112  Jim Donnelly
 112  Tony Jones
 110, 106  Joe Johnson
 110, 103  Bob Harris
 110  Kirk Stevens
 107  Dean Reynolds
 106  Wayne Jones
 104  Steve Newbury
 103  Paul Watchorn
 102  Dene O'Kane
 101  John Virgo

References

1986
Uk Championship
UK Championship
UK Championship